Horvitz is one of the variants of an Ashkenazi Jewish surname (for historical background see the Horowitz page). It is also a non Jewish surname as well.

It may refer to:

Daniel G. Horvitz (1921-2008), statistician
David Horvitz (born ca 1982), artist
H. Robert Horvitz (born 1947), biologist known for his work on c. elegans
Richard Horvitz (born 1966), actor, voice actor, and comedian
Wayne Horvitz (born 1955), composer and keyboardist
Wayne L. Horvitz (1920-2009), labor negotiator

See also 
Horowitz
Horovitz
Horwitz
Hurwitz

Jewish surnames
Surnames of Czech origin
Yiddish-language surnames